Lalit Behl (15 August 1949 – 23 April 2021) was an Indian actor, director, producer and writer.

Early life 

Lali Behl started acting as a college student and won inter varsity contest. He formed a theatre group at Kapurthala (Punjab) along with theatre enthusiasts Satish Sharma, Ravi Deep, Pramod Moutho Kamal Sharma his college friend and Harjeet Walia. He directed a number of stage plays including Kya Number Badlega, Chhatrian, Nayak Katha, Hara Samander Gopichander, Kumarswami and Suryast. He was a gold medalist from the Department of Indian Theatre, Panjab University, Chandigarh. He acted in plays by Mohan Maharishi.

Career 

Lalit Behl shifted to Delhi after doing his diploma in Indian Theatre and worked with Shriram Center and National School of Drama Repertory Company as a stage actor. he left his job to jump into the arena of television as a freelance producer director. He has produced and directed for Doordarshan telefilms such as Tapish, Happy Birthday, Aatish and Sunehri Jild and TV serials including Afsane, Ved Vyas Ke Pote, Mahasangram, Khanabadosh, Viji and Sada-e-Vadi.

As producer 
 Tapish (Hindi Telefilm)
 Happy Birthday (Hindi Telefilm)
 Aatish (Hindi Telefilm)
 Afsane (Hindi TV Serial)
 Ved Vyas Ke Pote (Hindi TV Serial)
 Mahasangram (TV Serial)
 Viji (TV Serial)
 Khanabadosh (Urdu TV Serial)
 Sunehri Jild (Punjabi Telefilm)
 Sada-E-Vadi (Hindi TV Serial)

As director 
 Kya Number Badlega (Stage Play)
 Surya Ki Antim Kiran Se surya Ki Pehli Kiran Tak (Stage Play)
 Suryast (Stage Play)
 Tapish (Hindi Telefilm)
 Happy Birthday (Hindi Telefilm)
 Aatish (Hindi Telefilm)
 Afsane (Hindi TV Serial)
 Ved Vyas Ke Pote (Hindi TV Serial)
 Mahasangram (TV Serial)
 Viji (TV Serial)
 Khanabadosh (Urdu TV Serial)
 Sunehri Jild (Punjabi Telefilm)
 Sada-E-Vadi (Hindi TV Serial)

As actor 
 Naye Khudaa (Stage Play)
 Godot Ki Aamad (Stage Play)
 Surya Ki Antim Kiran Se surya Ki Pehli Kiran Tak, (Stage Play 1976)
 Supne Te Parchhaven (Punjabi TV Serial)
 Kumarswami (Stage Play)
 Suryast (Stage Play)
 Joseph K. Ka Muqaddama (Stage Play 1981)
 Death of a Salesman (Stage Play)
 Tapish (Hindi Telefilm)
 Chirion Ka Chamba (Hindi Telefilm)
 Rani Kokilan (Telefilm)
 Happy Birthday (Hindi Telefilm)
 Aatish (Hindi Telefilm)
 Afsane (Hindi TV Serial)
 Sunehri Jild (Punjabi Telefilm)
 Sada-E-Vadi (Hindi TV Serial)
 Titli (2014) (Hindi film)
 Mukti Bhawan (Hindi Feature Film)
 Made in Heaven'' -2019 (Indian Web Series - Amazon Prime)
 Judgementall Hai Kya - 2019

Family 

Lalit Behl's wife Navnindra Behl is also a writer, director, producer and actress. His son, Kanu Behl, is a film writer and director.

References

External links 
https://web.archive.org/web/20100806190244/http://www.mohanmaharishi.in/productions/josephk1981.php
 

1949 births
2021 deaths
Indian male film actors
People from Punjab, India
Indian television producers
Indian male stage actors
Indian theatre directors
Male actors in Hindi cinema
Deaths from the COVID-19 pandemic in India